St George's School is an independent girls' school situated in the Ravelston district of Edinburgh, Scotland, which was rated 'Excellent' by Education Scotland in its most recent inspection.

In 2018 the school celebrated the 130th anniversary of its founding in 1888.

In 2021 the school announced that it would extend its provision for taking boys. Boys are welcome to the end of nursery in the academic year 2021 - 2022 and to the end of Primary 3 by 2024.

The school remains committed to the benefits of an all-round education with a distinctive ethos which is totally focused on and designed to educate girls aged 8 to 18 years.

In 2021 the school updated its name to ‘St George’s School, Edinburgh'. to reflect the addition of boys in the younger years of primary up to the end of Primary 3 by 2024.

The school is an all-through school from 3–18 years on one self-contained campus in the heart of Edinburgh. The size of the whole school is typically around 700 pupils and this is divided into three schools based on age and stage, including an Upper School (and Sixth Form), Lower School and Junior School with a Nursery.

History
The history of the school is an important part of the story of the Edinburgh Association for the University Education of Women and their drive to create university education for women in Scotland. The first meeting had taken place in 1866 before involving Mary Crudelius, Madeline Daniell and Sarah Mair. Their aim was to get women into Edinburgh University and Walker became the "chief intellect and administrator". In 1876, the ELEA decided to improve the pre-university stage of women's education and advertised classes in St. George's Hall to help women pass university entrance level qualification. They also developed correspondence courses for women who could not attend classes,

In 1885 Mary Russell Walker was recalled from the Maria Grey Training College to Edinburgh to lead the St George's Training College which would train the first women secondary school teachers in Scotland. Mary was made the head of the college and when St. George's High School for Girls was formed in 1888 she became its head as well. The first fifty students started in October 1888 using a building in Melville Street. The school was the first Scottish day school for girls which taught students all the way up to university entrance level. Girls from St. George's were among the first female graduates of Edinburgh University.

In 1912 the school took its first board students and the following year St George's Training College became part of the school. By 1920 it had fifty trainee teachers.

In 1939 the training college facility closed. During the second world war the army had the use of the school building whilst the students went south. Hallrule Hall in Bonchester Bridge became the school's temporary home from 1939 to 1942. When the students returned the building had to be renovated.

Curriculum 
The school's academic curriculum is a mix of GCSEs at 16, followed by Highers and Advanced Highers in the Sixth Form (S5 and S6).

In 2006 the headteacher started a cooperation programme with Chinese institutions, and by 2007 the school had Chinese clubs and Standard Mandarin as one of the languages offered.

Examination Courses 
St George’s students follow two-year GCSE courses, leading to examination at age 16, at the end of S4. Most girls will take nine subjects, including English Literature and English Language.  Following GCSEs, the vast majority of pupils will stay on to complete Highers at 17 (typically studying five subjects) and Advanced Highers at 18 (typically studying three or four subjects) in preparation for university entrance.

Co-curriculum 
Activities include:
 the Model United Nations and Debating clubs
 an extensive international student exchange programme with partner schools around the globe
 the Duke of Edinburgh Award and Combined Cadet Force, and charitable fundraising  
 numerous orchestras, choirs and bands, winning national competitions and performing on international tours
 sports teams covering everything from tennis, hockey, lacrosse, fencing, athletics, judo, and many more
 A recent addition to the clubs is the engineering club in which the school are restoring a Triumph Spitfire car. The school has its own St George’s Spitfire girl, Annie, who was at St George's as a boarder from 1924, with her younger sister.  She died on 2 October 2011. Her obituary in 'The Telegraph' described how Britain's most famous fighter 'plane, the Spitfire, was named after her.  Her father was Sir Robert McLean, chairman of Vickers in the 1930s.  He worked with the engineer R J Mitchell who was responsible for the aircraft's design.  When the time came to name it, McLean suggested 'Spitfire', his affectionate name for his daughter, Annie.

International Programme 
The school has a well established exchange programme with partner schools in Australia, Canada, Chile, Germany, South Africa, Spain and the United States. The school also runs digital exchanges with partner schools across the world where students collaborate on curriculum projects.

British Council’s International School Award (2017–2020) 
In 2019 the school was awarded a two year grant to run an Erasmus + programme entitled Community and Culture. This allows girls currently in S2 (Upper 4) to work collaboratively with students in Austria and Italy. Students will visit each other’s schools and learn more about what community and culture mean for them.

Links with boys schools 
Many events are held in conjunction with the long standing Edinburgh boys' school, Merchiston Castle School.

Notable alumni

 Kaye Adams, broadcaster and journalist
Carol Brown Janeway, translator and editor.
 Phyllis Bone, sculptor and first female member of the Royal Scottish Academy
 Sheila Burnford, novelist
 Dr Cordelia Fine, academic psychologist and writer
 Brigit Forsyth, actor
 Louise Linton, screenwriter and actress
 Candia McWilliam, award-winning author
 Penny Macmillan, journalist and broadcaster
 Kathleen Scott, Baroness Kenett, sculptor.
 Marie Stopes, scientist, author and pioneer in the field of birth control.
 Katie Targett-Adams, musician and recording artist
 Alice Thompson, novelist, 1996 winner of the James Tait Black Memorial Prize
 Isabel Oakeshott, award-winning journalist, author and commentator

Boarding
The girls from the ages of ten to eighteen live in Houldsworth House on the campus on the edge of the school grounds. The student Head of Boarding is elected by the boarders. The school has around 50 boarders, about 7% of the number of pupils.
The boarders form an integral part of the school and are made up of approximately 50% UK and 50% international students. St George's School celebrated the centenary of boarding at the school in 2012.

See also
Margaret Houldsworth
Sarah Mair
Jean Lindsay, headmistress, 1960–1976
Mary Russell Walker

References

Private schools in Edinburgh
Girls' schools in Edinburgh
Educational institutions established in 1888
Boarding schools in Edinburgh
Category B listed buildings in Edinburgh
Member schools of the Girls' Schools Association
1888 establishments in Scotland